Tony Roberts (born 1928) is an American retired sportscaster who was the play-by-play announcer for the Notre Dame Fighting Irish football team from 1980 until 2006. He is a member of the Indiana Broadcasters Hall of Fame, Holiday Bowl Hall of Fame and College Football Hall of Fame. In 2005, he won the Chris Schenkel Award. In 2006, he was replaced by Don Criqui as play-by-play announcer for Notre Dame.

Roberts is from Chicago, Illinois and graduated from Columbia College with a degree in journalism. He began his career working for radio stations in Iowa, Indiana and Washington, D.C. He has also worked covering the NFL, MLB, NBA, golf, and the Olympic Games.  Roberts was inducted into the National Radio Hall of Fame in 2016.

References

1928 births
Date of birth missing (living people)
Living people
American radio sports announcers
Chicago Bears announcers
College football announcers
Columbia College Chicago alumni
Golf writers and broadcasters
Major League Baseball broadcasters
National Basketball Association broadcasters
National Football League announcers
Notre Dame Fighting Irish football announcers
Olympic Games broadcasters
Sportspeople from Chicago
Washington Bullets announcers
Washington Senators (1961–1971) announcers